The World Mountain Bike Orienteering Championships is the official event for awarding World Champion titles in mountain bike orienteering. The World Championships, also known as WMTBOC, were first held in 2002, and since 2004 they have been organized annually – except in 2020.  The programme includes Long distance, Middle distance, Sprint, Mass Start (unofficial in 2016 and official from 2017), and a Relay for both men and women.

Host towns and cities
Below is a list of towns and cities that have hosted World Championships in mountain bike orienteering. Year, date, place and number of participating countries are shown.

Long distance

Men

Women

Middle distance

Men

Women

Sprint

Men

Women

Mass Start

Men

Women

Relay

Men

Women

References

 
Orienteering competitions
MTB
Mountain biking events
Recurring sporting events established in 2002